For the Crown and the Dragon is a novel by Stephen Hunt published by Green Nebula in 1994.

Plot summary
For the Crown and the Dragon is an 18th-century story where Britain is split into three islands held together by a cold-hearted and isolationist regime, while the rest of Europe is divided into a patchwork of warring city states.

Reception
Gordon Kibblewhite reviewed For the Crown and the Dragon for Arcane magazine, rating it a 7 out of 10 overall. Kibblewhite comments that "the tale is stranger and more cynical than a mere Sherwood Forest chestnut, and the raft of great characters have a black sense of humour to match. The battles are likewise well done, so that we are soon spattered not only with blood and gore, but with dirt, filth, ran and brine as well."

Reviews
Review by Carolyn Cushman (1995) in Locus, #408 January 1995

References

1994 novels